Keith Abu Bhonapha (born May 12, 1980) is an American football coach who is currently the assistant head coach and running backs coach at Oregon State University. He played college football at Hawaii, where also began his coaching career. He has also spent time as an assistant at University of Washington

Playing career 
Bhonapha played college football at Hawaii from 1999 to 2002, where he was a defensive back who was credited with the ability to play both safety and cornerback.

Coaching career

Hawaii 
Following his playing career, Bhonapha was offered a graduate assistant position at his alma mater Hawaii by head coach June Jones, where he helped to coach the defensive backs with secondary coach Rich Miano. While at Hawaii, he was credited with connecting Davone Bess with Hawaii, as the two had the same high school football coach.

Boise State 
Bhonapha was hired as the director of football operations at Boise State in 2006. He was reassigned to running backs coach in 2009 in a series of staff shuffling made by Boise State head coach Chris Petersen. He added the title of recruiting coordinator in 2011.

Washington 
Bhonapha followed Petersen to Washington in 2014 to serve as his running backs coach and the program's recruiting coordinator. While he was the recruiting coordinator, he and fellow assistant Ikaika Malloe were credited with rebuilding a recruiting pipeline in the state of Hawaii in part to their connections to the state that ended up with the successful recruitments of players such as Zion Tupuola-Fetui. He was promoted to special teams coordinator in 2021 following the promotion of Bob Gregory to defensive coordinator.

References

External links 
 
 Washington bio
 Hawaii bio

1980 births
Living people
Sportspeople from Oakland, California
Players of American football from Oakland, California
Coaches of American football from California
American football defensive backs
Hawaii Rainbow Warriors football players
Hawaii Rainbow Warriors football coaches
Boise State Broncos football coaches
Washington Huskies football coaches